Affonso Arinos de Mello Franco (November 11, 1930–March 15, 2020) was a Brazilian diplomat and journalist. He was born in Belo Horizonte on November 11, 1930. His parents were Affonso Arinos de Mello Franco and Anna Guilhermina Pereira de Mello Franco. He was grandnephew of Afonso Arinos.

Education
He has undertaken the following degrees and courses: 
 Bachelor's Degree in Legal and Social Sciences at the National Faculty of Law of the University of Brazil, in 1949–53; 
 the Diplomat Career Preparation Course at the Rio Branco Institute, of the Ministry of Foreign Affairs, in 1951–52; 
 the Doctorate course, Section of Public Law, at the National Law Faculty of the University of Brazil, in 1954–55; 
 the Diplomat Improvement course at the Rio Branco Institute of the Ministry of Foreign Affairs, in 1954; 
 the course of the Instituto Superior de Estudos Brasileiros, at the Ministry of Education and Culture, in 1955; 
 the Specialization Course in Politics and International Law at the Faculty of Political and Social Sciences at the International University of Social Studies Pro Deo, Rome, in 1958; 
 the Trade Promotion course at the International Trade Center of the United Nations Conference on Trade and Development and the General Agreement on Tariffs and Trade, in Geneva, in 1968; 
 the Theoretical and Applied Economics course at the Graduate School of Economics of the Brazilian Institute of Economics of the Getulio Vargas Foundation, in 1975; 
 the Superior War Course at the Escola Superior de Guerra, in 1975; 
 the Update Course at the Escola Superior de Guerra, in 1980.

Career
He began his diplomat career in 1952 as a Third Class Consul, and in 1953 he did an internship at the Legal Affairs Division of the United Nations Legal Department in New York.

He contributed to a wide range of print and electronic media, among them magazine Manchete, Jornal do Brasil, Tribuna da Imprensa, Fatos e Fotos / Gente, TV Educativa, Enciclopédia Ilustrada do Brasil, TV Manchete, Jornal do Commercio, A Época, O Metropolitano, A Noite, Correio Braziliense, Revista Civilização Brasileira, Revista Nacional and others.

From 1960 to 1962, he was a deputy to the Constituent and Legislative Assembly of the State of Guanabara, in which he stood out as a member of the Constitution and Justice Commission in 1961, and as president of the Education Commission in 1962. In 1964–65, he was professor of Contemporary Civilization in the Journalism Department of the Central Institute of Letters of the University of Brasilia. From 1964 to 1966, he was a federal deputy for the State of Guanabara, having been, in 1965–66, a member of the Foreign Affairs Committee of the Chamber of Deputies.

He was the sixth occupant of Chair number 17 at the Brazilian Academy of Letters, elected on July 22, 1999, in succession to Antonio Houaiss. He was received on November 26, 1999 by academic José Sarney. In turn he received the academic José Murilo de Carvalho.

Affonso Arinos died on March 15, 2020, in Rio de Janeiro, at the age of 89. He was succeeded by Fernanda Montenegro at the Brazilian Academy of Letters.

References

Brazilian diplomats